The cross-correlation matrix of two random vectors is a matrix containing as elements the cross-correlations of all pairs of elements of the random vectors. The cross-correlation matrix is used in various digital signal processing algorithms.

Definition

and has dimensions . Written component-wise:

The random vectors  and  need not have the same dimension, and either might be a scalar value.

Example

Complex random vectors

where  denotes Hermitian transposition.

Uncorrelatedness

They are uncorrelated if and only if their cross-covariance matrix  matrix is zero.

In the case of two complex random vectors  and  they are called uncorrelated if

and

Properties

Relation to the cross-covariance matrix
The cross-correlation is related to the cross-covariance matrix as follows:

 Respectively for complex random vectors:

See also
Autocorrelation
Correlation does not imply causation
Covariance function
Pearson product-moment correlation coefficient
Correlation function (astronomy)
Correlation function (statistical mechanics)
Correlation function (quantum field theory)
Mutual information
Rate distortion theory
Radial distribution function

References

Further reading
 Hayes, Monson H., Statistical Digital Signal Processing and Modeling, John Wiley & Sons, Inc., 1996. .
 Solomon W. Golomb, and Guang Gong. Signal design for good correlation: for wireless communication, cryptography, and radar. Cambridge University Press, 2005.
 M. Soltanalian. Signal Design for Active Sensing and Communications. Uppsala Dissertations from the Faculty of Science and Technology (printed by Elanders Sverige AB), 2014.

Covariance and correlation
Time series
Spatial analysis
Matrices
Signal processing